Ustye is a rural locality (a selo) in Kolokshanskoye Rural Settlement, Sobinsky District, Vladimir Oblast, Russia. The population was 38 as of 2010.

Geography 
Ustye is located 27 km northeast of Sobinka (the district's administrative centre) by road. Bolshoye is the nearest rural locality.

References 

Rural localities in Sobinsky District